Isabel Brown (6 December 1894 – 22 October 1984) was a British communist activist.

Born on Tyneside, Brown obtained a scholarship to attend the Sunderland Teacher Training College.  Initially highly religious, she changed her views as a result of World War I, and through attending National Council of Labour Colleges lectures led by T. A. Jackson.  She became active in the National Union of Teachers and joined the Labour Party in 1918.

In 1921, Isabel married Ernest Brown, a local communist, and she became a founder member of the Communist Party of Great Britain (CPGB), one of only five women delegates to attend its founding congress.  She lost her teaching post the following year, when she became pregnant, and moved with Ernest to Moscow in 1924, returning just before the UK general strike.  During the strike, Brown was jailed for sedition, and was again imprisoned soon after her release, while she was speaking in support of miners who were still striking.

In the late 1920s, Brown organised women's sections of the National Unemployed Workers' Movement.  Ernest became the CPGB's Scottish organiser, and she moved with him, becoming women's editor of The Mineworker.  She stood unsuccessfully in Motherwell at the 1929 general election, and then in the Kilmarnock by-election, later in the year.

In 1930, Brown studied at the Lenin School, then led the British Committee for the Relief of Victims of Fascism and was prominent in the Aid for Spain committee.  She was particularly well known for her speeches, which were moving and held audiences' attention, and for her ability to answer questions from the public.

Brown became extremely active in the British Aid for Spain movement, playing a central role in the cross-party National Joint Committee for Spanish Relief. This included helping out with efforts to house the Basque refugees which came to Britain in 1937.

Late in 1930s, Brown became the national women's organiser for the CPGB, and she stood in the 1940 Bow and Bromley by-election, taking only 4.2% of the vote even though she faced only one opponent.  Injured in an air raid later in the year, she never fully recovered, standing down as women's officer in 1942, and from the Central Committee in 1947.  She stood in her final election at Kilmarnock at the 1950 general election, again failing to come near winning the seat.

Despite increasingly poor health, Brown continued to speak on behalf of the CPGB, teach and attend conferences until her death in 1984.

References

1894 births
1984 deaths
Alumni of the University of Sunderland
Communist Party of Great Britain members
Schoolteachers from Tyne and Wear
English trade unionists
International Lenin School alumni
English women trade unionists